Vadim Nikolayevich Karlashchuk (born 30 July 1984) is a Russian former professional football player.

External links
 

1984 births
Sportspeople from Volgograd
Living people
Russian footballers
Russia under-21 international footballers
Association football defenders
FC Olimpia Volgograd players
FC Shinnik Yaroslavl players
FC Spartak Moscow players
FC Arsenal Kharkiv players
Ukrainian First League players
Russian expatriate footballers
Expatriate footballers in Ukraine